Black Gold is a Brooklyn, New York, U.S.-based music project with Eric Ronick (lead vocals, keyboards) and Than Luu (pronounced "Tahn" drums, guitar, percussions, vocals) formed in early 2006. The project was started after touring with M. Ward, Ambulance LTD, Rachael Yamagata, Panic! at the Disco, and Adam Franklin of Swervedriver. The formation followed with writing and recording at Ronick's Thinman Studios in Brooklyn, that culminated in the release of their debut album, Rush, released on February 3, 2009. Singles from the album include "Detroit" and "Plans & Reveries".  Their single "Plans & Reveries" is hypothesized to be the most popular song from the music group, and it conveys the idea that some ideas are stuck to and followed while others become reveries and are never accomplished.

Their single "Plans & Reveries" has been featured on The CW's One Tree Hill in the episode "Deep Ocean Vast Sea" which aired on October 19, 2009, and "Shine" was featured on the seventh season of So You Think You Can Dance as the farewell song.  They performed live on the season finale of the show, Thursday August 12, 2010, where Ronick began the song by playing piano, but quickly abandoned it to instead pursue a solo vocal montage of the season's emotional moments. "Shine" was also featured in the film Valentine's Day and appears on the soundtrack.

Band members

Current members

Eric Ronick – lead vocals, keyboard, guitar (2006–present)
Than Luu – drums, percussion, backing vocals (2006–present)

Current touring members
Marty O'Kane - guitar (2012–present)
Nate Allen - bass (2012–present)

Former touring members
Eugene – bass (2006–Unknown)
Siggy Sjursen - bass (Unknown–2008)
Shiben Bhattacharya - bass (2008–2009)
Alistair Paxton - guitar, backing vocals (Unknown–2012)
Kerry Wayne-James - bass (2009–2012)

References

External links
Official website

Rock music groups from New York (state)
Musical groups from Brooklyn